Willis Hubbard Sargent Elected to the NY Assembly in 1925 and served 8 years through 1933. Then served 1 term as President of the Syracuse Common Council 1934-1935. Later served in the California State Assembly for the 47th district from 1943 to 1945 and during World War I he served in the United States Army.

References

United States Army personnel of World War I
Members of the California State Legislature
1896 births
1976 deaths